APOK Velouchi F.C. is a Greek football club, based in Karpenisi, Evrytania, Greece

Honors

Domestic Titles and honors

 Evrytania FCA Champions: 12
 1990-91, 1992–93, 1994–95, 1996–97, 1999-00, 2000–01, 2001–02, 2003–04, 2005–06, 2010–11, 2013–14, 2016-17
 Phthiotis-Phocis FCA Cup Winners: 1
 1984-85
 Evrytania FCA Cup Winners: 18
 1990-91, 1991–92, 1992–93, 1993–94, 1995–96, 1996–97, 1997–98, 1998–99, 2000–01, 2001–02, 2002–03, 2004–05, 2006–07, 2008–09, 2009–10, 2011–12, 2012–13, 2017-18

References

Evrytania
Association football clubs established in 1968
1968 establishments in Greece
Gamma Ethniki clubs